The Porsche Typ 754 T7, also known as the T7 Prototype or 695, is a prototype automobile built by Porsche in 1961. It would later become the Porsche 911. The front end is very similar to the 911, but the rear is somewhat different. Also, unlike the 911, the T7 had four seats. The T7 was developed from the Porsche 356 by Ferdinand Alexander Porsche, and has a wheelbase that is  longer (up to  longer in early designs).

The car is currently on display at the Porsche Museum, Stuttgart.

References

External links
Picture and information about the 695

Typ 754 T7